The Ruisui Tropic of Cancer Marker is a monument marking the Tropic of Cancer in Ruisui Township, Hualien County, Taiwan.

History
The monument was originally constructed in 1933 west of Ruisui Railway Station. Due to the Hualien–Taitung line tracks replacement work carried out in 1981, the monument had to be relocated to Wuhe Terrace and placed along the Provincial Highway 9.

Geology
At noon on 22 June every year, the monument shows no shadow due to the position of the sun exactly above it.

Transportation
The monument is accessible within walking distance south of Ruisui Station of Taiwan Railways.

See also
 Geography of Taiwan

References

1933 establishments in Taiwan
Buildings and structures in Hualien County
Monuments and memorials in Taiwan
Tourist attractions in Hualien County